William the Conqueror is the sixth book in the Just William series by Richmal Crompton. It was first published in 1926. It is a book of short stories, and its name is a pun on William the Conqueror, a famous king of England.

Short stories
Enter the Sweep - William takes possession of a delightful pile of soot – and causes mischief.
A Birthday Treat - The Outlaws stage a "waxworks" show as a birthday treat for Ginger's beautiful aunt. However, there is a mix-up over the venue.
The Leopard Hunter - Mr. Falconer, an old acquaintance of William's father comes to stay and annoys everyone with his incessant boasting. William devises a clever plan to get rid of him. 
William Leads a Better Life - The Outlaws are inspired to follow the example of St. Francis of Assisi, but find this more difficult than they had expected.
William and the Lost Tourist - An American visitor to the village mistakes William for a descendant of William Shakespeare.
The Midnight Adventure of Miss Montague - William attempts to steal his things that Miss Frame's new tenant, Miss Montague, has confiscated
The Mysterious Stranger - William and his friends believe a newcomer to the village is the villain from a novel they have been reading.
The Sunday-School Treat - William believes he has discovered a conspiracy to murder his sister Ethel.
William the Philanthropist - The Outlaws (with the unsolicited help of Violet Elizabeth) emulate Robin Hood, robbing from the rich and giving to the poor.
William the Bold Crusader - Inspired by the curate's talk on the Crusades, William stages a "crusade" of his own against "heretics" (namely the local nonconformist Sunday-school) and worshippers of "idylls".
The Wrong Party - After the Hubert Lanites ruin William's party, the Outlaws attempt to get their revenge.
William Starts the Holidays - Despite his best intentions, William manages to wreck Robert and Ethel's Christmas party.
Revenge Is Sweet - William's gang finally takes revenge on the Hubert Lanites.

References

External links
 

1926 children's books
1926 short story collections
Children's short story collections
Just William
Short story collections by Richmal Crompton
George Newnes Ltd books